Sven Gunnar Dahlvig is a Swedish philatelist who signed the Roll of Distinguished Philatelists in 2000.

References

Signatories to the Roll of Distinguished Philatelists
Living people
Year of birth missing (living people)
Swedish philatelists
Place of birth missing (living people)